Hey Paula may refer to:

 "Hey Paula" (song), a 1962 single by Paul & Paula
 Hey Paula (TV series), a Bravo network reality series in 2007 starring Paula Abdul